Artificial Waves is a Moscow band experimenting with contemporary instrumental music such as post-rock, post-metal, math rock, etc.

Members
Alexey Pereverzev – guitar, keyboards, samples; 
Arthur Kudrov – guitar; 
Dmitry Kaleev – bass; 
Ilya Kosharov – drums

Discography

Transient (released on 20 September 2012, the first single from upcoming EP called Initial Link)
Studio Live Session (released 12 November 2012, a LIVE mini-album that was recorded during rehearsal and consists of four tracks that will be included in upcoming studio EP, INITIAL LINK)
Event Horizon (released on 29 December 2012, the second single from upcoming EP called Initial Link)
Initial Link (released on 24 March 2013, the first studio album)
Extrapolation (released on 30 September 2013, the first single from upcoming EP called Changes, which had actually not been titled yet by then)
Falling Sky (released on 29 December 2013, the second single from upcoming EP called Changes, which had actually not been titled yet by then)
Lunation (released on 28 April 2014, the last single from upcoming EP called Changes)
Changes (released on 30 June 2014, the second studio album)

References
 "Artificial Waves". Bandcamp. Retrieved on 4 January 2015.

External links

Russian post-rock groups
Ambient music groups
Russian electronic music groups
Instrumental musical groups
Musical groups established in 2013
Russian musical trios
2013 establishments in Russia